Kombe may refer to:
Kombe people
Kombe language
Kombe (Lycia), an ancient city
 Kömbe, a baked filled pastry of Turkey and Azerbaijan

People with the surname
 Paulin Tokala Kombe (born 1977), DR Congolese football player
 Saviour Kombe (born 1991), Zambian track and field sprinter
 Imran Kombe, Tanzanian military officer

See also
 Katakokombe, a region in the Democratic Republic of Congo
 Katako'kombe Airport
 Katako-Kombe Territory
 Strophanthus kombe, a vine found in the tropical regions of Eastern Africa